Andries Hendrik Potgieter, known as Hendrik Potgieter (19 December 1792 – 16 December 1852) was a Voortrekker leader and the last known Champion of the Potgieter family. He served as the first head of state of Potchefstroom from 1840 and 1845 and also as the first head of state of Zoutpansberg from 1845 to 1852.

Beyond the Orange River
Potgieter and his party moved inland to the present Free State, where they signed a treaty with the leader of the Barolong, Moroka. The treaty stipulated that Potgieter would protect the Baralong against the Matabele raiders, in exchange for land. The tract of land was from the Vet River to the Vaal River.

The Matabele leader, Mzilikazi, was threatened by the white incursion into what he saw as his sphere of influence, which led to the Matabele's attack on the Potgieter laager in October 1836, at Vegkop, near the present-day town of Heilbron. The attack was beaten off, but the Matabele made off with most of the trekker oxen, crucial draught animals for the wagons. The combined trek groups of Piet Retief and Gerrit Maritz came to Potgieter's rescue. Moroka also helped with oxen. His group joined up with Retief and Maritz at Thaba Nchu, where they formed a Voortrekker government and decided to move to Natal. Potgieter was not in favour of this plan and stayed behind in the Free State.

Dingane campaign
In 1838, after Piet Retief and his party were killed by Dingane, and other Voortrekker parties were attacked (Weenen massacre) at the Bloukrans and Bushman Rivers, Potgieter and another leader, Pieter Lafras Uys assembled a military force. To prevent schism and discord, the new Voortrekker leader in Natal, Maritz, diplomatically pronounced that both Uys and Potgieter were to be in command. However, a struggle between the hot-headed Uys and Potgieter ensued.

The divided force was lured into an ambush by the Zulus at Italeni, and both Uys and his son Dirkie, were killed. The surrounded and outnumbered force fled. Potgieter was criticised for his actions, and the force was called "Die Vlugkommado" or Flight Commando. He was further accused, unjustly, of causing the death of Uys by deliberately leading the force into the ambush. He left Natal for good soon afterwards and moved to the Transvaal.

Transvaal settlements
Potgieter subsequently went on to found Potchefstroom (named after him), by the banks of the Mooi River, and served as its first head of state of the Potchefstroom Republic between 1840 and 1845. Later, in 1845, he also founded Ohrigstad (originally named Andries-Ohrigstad after Potgieter himself and George Ohrig) as a trading station. Owing to a malaria outbreak, the town had to be abandoned. The inhabitants, including Potgieter, moved to the Soutpansberg area, where he founded the town Zoutpansbergdorp (which means 'Salt Pan Mountain Town'), later renamed Schoemansdal.

After the 1842 annexation of Natal by Britain, many Natal Trekkers moved to the Free State and the Transvaal. These newcomers and their leader, Andries Pretorius, refused to accept the authority of Potgieter, and a power struggle developed. War was averted, and in 1848 a peace treaty was signed in Rustenburg. Potgieter died on 16 December 1852, in Zoutpansbergdorp. A number of African chiefs who held him in very high regard came to pay their respects before his death.

See also
Blyde River

References

External links

1792 births
1852 deaths
People from the Eastern Cape
Afrikaner people
South African people of Dutch descent
19th-century South African people
History of KwaZulu-Natal
Great Trek
South African Republic politicians